Frank Marion Watt (December 15, 1902 - August 31, 1956), nicknamed "Kilo", was an American professional baseball pitcher. In 38 career games, he had a 5-5 record with a 4.84 ERA. He batted and threw right-handed.

He was the brother of fellow Major League players, Allie Watt.

Watt was born and died in Washington, D.C.

External links

1902 births
1956 deaths
Philadelphia Phillies players
Baseball players from Washington, D.C.
Major League Baseball pitchers
Greeneville Burley Cubs players